There are six main administrative districts of Israel, known in Hebrew as mekhozot (singular: makhoz ) and Arabic as mintaqah and fifteen sub-districts known as nafot (singular: nafa ). Each sub-district is further divided into natural regions, cities, municipalities, and regional councils it contains.

The present division into districts was established in 1953, to replace the divisions inherited from the British Mandate. It has remained substantially the same ever since; a second proclamation of District boundaries issued in 1957 – which remains in force as of 2022 – only affirmed the existing boundaries in place.

The figures in this article are based on numbers from the Israeli Central Bureau of Statistics and so include all places under Israeli civilian rule including those Israeli-occupied territories where this is the case. Therefore, the Golan sub-district and its four natural regions are included in the number of sub-districts and natural regions even though it is not recognized by the United Nations or the international community as Israeli territory.  Similarly, the population figure below for the Jerusalem District was calculated including East Jerusalem whose annexation by Israel is similarly not recognized by the United Nations and the international community. The Judea and Samaria Area, however, is not included in the number of districts and sub-districts as Israel has not applied its civilian jurisdiction in that part of the West Bank.

Administration
The districts have no elected institutions of any kind, although they do possess councils composed of representatives of central government ministries and local authorities for planning and building purposes. Their administration is undertaken by a District Commissioner appointed by the Minister of the Interior. Each district also has a District Court.

Since the District Commissioners are considered part of the Ministry of the Interior's bureaucracy, they can only exercise functions falling within the purview of other ministries if the appropriate Minister authorizes them. This authorization is rarely granted, as other government ministries and institutions (for example, the Ministry of Health and the Police) establish their own divergent systems of districts.

Jerusalem District
Jerusalem District (Mehoz Yerushalayim)
Population ( 2018): 1,133,700
Area: 653 km2

District capital: Jerusalem.

Natural regions:

 111 Judean Mountains
 112 Judean Foothills

Northern District
Northern District (Mehoz HaTzafon)
Population ( 2018): 1,448,100
Area: 4,473 km2

District capital: Nof Hagalil

Tzfat (sub-district)population: 121,200
211 Hula Valley
212 Eastern Upper Galilee
213 Hazor Region
214 Central Lower Galilee
Kinneret (sub-district)population: 112,900
221 Kinerot
222 Eastern Lower Galilee
Yizre'el (sub-district)population: 520,100
231 Bet She’an Valley
232 Harod Valley
233 Kokhav Plateau   
234 Yizre’el Valley   
235 Yoqne’am Region   
236 Menashe Plateau   
237 Nazareth-Tir’an Mountains
Akko (sub-district)population: 643,300
241 Shefar’am Region      
242 Karmi’el Region     
243 Yehi’am Region     
244 Elon Region 
245 Nahariyya Region    
246 Akko Region 
Golan (sub-district)population: 50,600
 291 Hermon Region
 292 Northern Golan
 293 Middle Golan
 294 Southern Golan

Haifa District
Haifa District (Mehoz Heifa)
Population ( 2018): 1,032,800
Area: 866 km2

District capital: Haifa

Haifa (sub-district)population: 583,400
311 Haifa Region
Hadera (sub-district)population: 449,300
321 Karmel Coast
322 Zikhron Ya’aqov Region
323 Alexander Mountain
324 Hadera Region

Central District
Central District (Mehoz HaMerkaz)
Population ( 2018): 2,196,100
Area: 1,294 km2

District capital: Ramla

Sharon (sub-district)population: 477,400
411 Western Sharon
412 Eastern Sharon
Petah Tikva (sub-district)population: 754,300
421 Southern Sharon
422 Petah Tiqwa Region
Ramla (sub-district)population: 351,700
431 Modi’in Region
432 Ramla Region
Rehovot (sub-district)population: 612,600
441 Rehovot Region
442 Rishon LeZiyyon Region

Tel Aviv District
Tel Aviv District (Mehoz Tel Aviv)
Population ( 2018): 1,427,200
Area: 172 km2

District capital: Tel Aviv

 511 Tel Aviv Region
 512 Ramat Gan Region
 513 Holon Region

Southern District
Southern District (Mehoz HaDarom)
Population ( 2018): 1,302,000
Area: 14,185 km2

District Capital: Beersheba
Ashkelon (sub district)population: 551,200
611 Mal’akhi Region
612 Lakhish Region
613 Ashdod Region
614 Ashqelon Region
Be'er Sheva (sub-district)population: 750,700
621 Gerar Region
622 Besor Region
623 Be’er Sheva Region
624 Dead Sea Region
625 Arava Region
626 Northern Negev Mountain
627 Southern Negev Mountain

Formerly the Hof Aza Regional Council with a population of around 10,000 Israelis was part of this district, but the Israeli communities that constituted it were evacuated when the disengagement plan was implemented in the Gaza Strip. Since the withdrawal, the Coordination and Liaison Administration operates there.

Judea and Samaria Area
Judea and Samaria Area (Ezor Yehuda VeShomron)
Israeli Population ( 2018): 427,800
Arab/Bedouin population: 40,000. (excludes Area A and B).

Largest city: Modi'in Illit

The name Judea and Samaria for this geographical area is based on terminology from the Hebrew and other sources relating to ancient Israel and Judah/Judea. The territory has been under Israeli control since the 1967 Six-Day War but not annexed by Israel, pending negotiations regarding its status. It is part of historic Israel, which leads to politically contentious issues. However, it is not recognized as part of the State of Israel by the United Nations and most nations.

There are no sub-districts and no natural regions in the Judea and Samaria Area.

See also
Geography of Israel
List of cities in Israel
ISO 3166-2:IL

Notes

References

External links
Central Bureau of Statistics detailed breakdown of each district, sub-district, and natural region.

 
Subdivisions of Israel
Israel, Districts
Israel 1
Districts, Israel
Israel geography-related lists